Zhirov is a Russian male surname. Its feminine counterpart is Zhirova. The surname is derived from the word жир (zhir, meaning "fat") and may refer to:

 Vassiliy Jirov (born 1974), Kazakh boxer
 Aleksandr Zhirov (1958–1983), Soviet alpine skier
 Aleksandr Zhirov (born 1991), Russian footballer
 Andrei Zhirov (born 1971), Russian footballer and coach
 Nikolay Zhirov, Soviet bobsledder
 Yevgeny Zhirov, Russian footballer
 Marina Zhirova (born 1963), Russian sprinter

Russian-language surnames